Rugby union in Nigeria is a minor but growing sport. They are currently ranked 70th by World Rugby.

Governing body 
The governing body is the Nigerian Rugby Football Federation.

History
Rugby union was first introduced into Nigeria by the British empire. For a number of years the game was dominated by white settlers and expatriates, and to an extent, a number of expatriate oil workers still play there.

A number of Nigerian people have emigrated to the UK, and there is a London Nigerian Rugby Club.

Notable players
A number of notable England players were born or raised in Nigeria, including:

 Adedayo Adebayo
 Ayoola Erinle 
 Steve Ojomoh
 Victor Ubogu
 Topsy Ojo
 Chris Oti
 Marcus Watson
 Andrew Harriman

Bright Sodje who formerly played for Wakefield RFC and current England international Maro Itoje are also of Nigerian background.

See also 
 Nigeria national rugby union team 
 Confederation of African Rugby
 Africa Cup

External links
 IRB Nigeria page 
 CAR
 Nigerian women holding their own in rugby
 Club plans big for rugby in Nigeria
 Nigeria reaches milestone
  Historique
 "Islam and Rugby" on the Rugby Readers review

References